Mobile Telecommunication Company Saudi Arabia is a telecommunications services company that offers fixed line, mobile telephony, and Internet services under the brand name Zain Saudi Arabia. Zain was the third mobile network operator in Saudi Arabia. It was launched on 26 August 2008 and it enrolled more than 2 million subscribers within 4 months of its launch.

History
The company paid $6.1 billion for a license to operate in Saudi Arabia for 25 years. Mobile Telecommunication Company Saudi Arabia was listed on the Tadawul on 22 March 2008.

Zain launched mobile services in Saudi Arabia on 26 August 2008.

The company negotiated a $2.5 billion Islamic loan in 2009.

Zain appointed a new chairman on 23 March 2013. This news came within a week of Saudi Telecom's (STC) CEO resigning from his position.

Infrastructure 
In 2021, Zain Saudi Arabia owned 8,069 telecom towers in Saudi Arabia, valued at 3,026 million Saudi riyals (807 million US dollars).

Radio Frequency Summary

References

External links
 

2008 establishments in Saudi Arabia
Telecommunications companies established in 2008
Companies listed on Tadawul
Telecommunications companies of Saudi Arabia
Mobile phone companies of Saudi Arabia
Companies based in Riyadh